Quarton may refer to:
Enguerrand Quarton (or Charonton), French painter
Metropolitan Parkway (Detroit area)